NIG or Nig may refer to:

 NIG (insurance company)
 Nig (nickname), various people
 Nig, Iran
 Nig, a canton in Ayrarat, Armenia
 Naigaon railway station (station code: NIG)
 National Institute of Genetics
 Ngalakgan language (ISO 639:nig)
 Nigger (Nig or Nig-nog), a racial slur
 Nik, South Khorasan, romanized as Nig
 Nikunau Airport (IATA: NIG)
 Normal-inverse Gaussian distribution

See also
 Nigg (disambiguation)